KeyCreator is a commercial software application for 2D and 3D computer-aided design (CAD) and drafting available since 2004.

History 
KeyCreator is a non-parametric, non-history based, "direct" 2D/3D solid modeling CAD program. Originally known as CADKEY, it was first released in 1984, running on DOS, UNIX and Microsoft Windows operating systems.  It was among the first CAD programs with 3D capabilities for personal computers. Besides solid modeling, KeyCreator is also capable of wire-frame and surface modeling, as well as drafting.

Design

File formats and versions 
KeyCreator’s native file format is .ckd.

Languages 
KeyCreator is available for English, German, French, Italian, Spanish, Japanese, and Brazilian Portuguese.

Extensions 
KeyCreator is capable of translating and editing the following file formats from other CAD software:

AutoCAD .dwg, .dxf
Autodesk Inventor .ipt, .iam
CADKEY .prt, .cdl 
Catia .mod, .model, .catproduct, .catpart
SolidWorks .sldprt, .sldasm
Pro/Engineer .prt, .asm
PTC Creo .prt
Siemens NX .prt
Unigraphics .prt
 Neutral formats such as STEP .stp, IGES .igs, Parasolid .x_t, and ACIS .sat
 Stereolithography (for 3D printing) .stl

Add-On Software 
KeyCreator has several additional software options for varying functions.

XMD - Expert Mold Designer provides intelligent automation, custom plate stack layouts, and part revision management. XMD includes tens of thousands of standard components designers need for mold, die, fixture, and machine design.
KeyCreator Machinist is a 2 and 3 axis CAM solution for Mold, die & tooling, wood working, rapid prototyping and general machining.
KeyCreator Artisan allows 3D models to be turned into photorealistic renderings.
KeyCreator Viewer is a no-cost program for reviewing 3D models and drawings stored in CKD files.

Designed with KeyCreator 
Aero Tec Laboratories used KeyCreator to design crash resistant, nonexploding fuel-bladder tanks for aircraft, race cars, and performance boats.  They have made custom bladder tanks for NASCAR, Ferrari, Boeing, Lockheed, NASA and the U.S. Military.

See also 
 CADKEY

References

External links 

 KeyCreator Official Website

1984 software
Computer-aided design software